Vandalia is a city in Montgomery County, Ohio, United States, and a suburb of Dayton. Its population was 15,246 during the 2010 census.  In addition to being the city closest to Dayton International Airport, Vandalia lies at the crossroads of I-75 and I-70, making it a major hub for business.

History
On August 17, 1838, Benjamin Wilhelm, a settler from Pennsylvania, settled near what is now the intersection of U.S. Route 40 and US Route 25-A.  He built his home and a small general store as a stop and resting place for travelers heading west.  The small town began to attract travelers and entrepreneurs, and on February 7, 1848, the town was incorporated as "The Village of Vandalia" with Benjamin Wilhelm as its first mayor.  The village was laid out in 38 lots including a church, hotels, blacksmiths shops, a steam sawmill, meat markets, and a carriage shop.  It was named after Vandalia, Illinois.

By 1959, Vandalia was outgrowing its "village" status, and its citizens voted to make it a council-manager form of government, effectively making the village into a municipal corporation.  On January 2, 1960, Vandalia became a Charter City of the State of Ohio.

The Delphi Automotive manufacturing plant in Vandalia, which opened in the 1930s, cut back operations in 2003. It continued to operate "through Delphi’s time in Chapter 11 bankruptcy protection, from October 2005 to October 2009," and was purchased by Mahle Behr in 2015.

Until 2005, Vandalia was home to the Amateur Trapshooting Association (ATA), which moved to Sparta, Illinois after an expansion of the Dayton International Airport.

Name
Some records indicate that Benjamin Wilhelm, the town's founder, settled in Vandalia on his way to Vandalia, Illinois.  Instead, he stopped here and named his new town after his original destination.  Others claim that the town was named Vandalia because the National Road was intended to extend to Vandalia, Illinois, but, for a time, it looked as though it would not do so.  This doubt resulted in the name being used for a town along the Road in Ohio.

Revitalization
The city of Vandalia passed plans to reinvent the city's urban core around National Road and Dixie Drive. The plan is to bring many of the old shopping centers to the street front while placing parking spaces in the back. The first business to take part in this plan was My Favorite Pet on National in which a new building was built next to Wendy's in 2008.

Geography
It is between the Great Miami River and the Stillwater River. The city has been called the "Crossroads of America" due to its location on the National Road and the Dixie Highway. These correspond to U.S. Route 40 and former U.S. Route 25, which in turn, have been supplanted by two major expressways: east-west Interstate 70 and north–south Interstate 75.

Demographics

Vandalia is part of the Dayton Metropolitan Statistical Area.

2010 census
As of the census of 2010, there were 15,246 people, 6,571 households, and 4,166 families residing in the city. The racial makeup of the city was 91.5% White, 4.1% African American, 0.1% Native American, 1.4% Asian, 0.6% from other races, and 2.1% from two or more races. Hispanic or Latino of any race were 1.6% of the population.

There were 6,571 households, of which 30.0% had children under the age of 18 living with them, 46.5% were married couples living together, 12.3% had a female householder with no husband present, 4.7% had a male householder with no wife present, and 36.6% were non-families. 31.1% of all households were made up of individuals, and 10.2% had someone living alone who was 65 years of age or older. The average household size was 2.30 and the average family size was 2.88.

The median age in the city was 40.6 years. 23.1% of residents were under the age of 18; 8.3% were between the ages of 18 and 24; 24.2% were from 25 to 44; 28.7% were from 45 to 64, and 15.7% were 65 years of age or older. The gender makeup of the city was 48.4% male and 51.6% female.

2000 census
As of the census of 2000, there were 14,603 people, 6,235 households, and 4,090 families residing in the city. As of 2009 there were 27,298 citizens. The population density was 1,236.5 people per square mile (477.4/km). There were 6,489 housing units at an average density of 549.5 per square mile (212.1/km). The racial makeup of the city was 96.08% White, 1.28% African American, 0.13% Native American, 1.23% Asian, 0.03% Pacific Islander, 0.35% from other races, and 0.90% from two or more races. Hispanic or Latino of any race were 0.89% of the population.

There were 6,235 households, out of which 30.1% had children under the age of 18 living with them, 52.0% were married couples living together, 10.3% had a female householder with no husband present, and 34.4% were non-families. 29.8% of all households were made up of individuals, and 8.5% had someone living alone who was 65 years of age or older. The average household size was 2.32 and the average family size was 2.88.

In the city, the population was spread out, with 23.6% under the age of 18, 8.1% from 18 to 24, 29.7% from 25 to 44, 25.0% from 45 to 64, and 13.6% who were 65 years of age or older. The median age was 38 years. For every 100 females, there were 94.4 males. For every 100 females age 18 and over, there were 90.9 males.

The median income for a household in the city was $44,463, and the median income for a family was $55,270. Males had a median income of $41,938 versus $26,853 for females. The per capita income for the city was $24,199. About 3.5% of families and 5.2% of the population were below the poverty line, including 6.2% of those under age 18 and 5.4% of those age 65 or over.

Events
The City of Vandalia boasts several seasonal festivals and events, such as the annual Oktoberfest in the autumn, the Homecoming parade in the fall, and the Air Show & Parade in the summer. They also host a firework show, The Star-Spangled Celebration. Other events include "Taste of Vandalia", a culinary event, and the Vandalia Corporate Challenge.
St. Christopher Catholic Church also hosts the Vandalia Fair every summer, one of the largest in the Miami Valley.

Parks and Recreation
Vandalia is a top-rated parks and recreation community. Vandalia has over thirty parks in the area. Some of the larger ones include Helke Park and the Vandalia Sports Complex. It is also home to the Taylorsville Metropark, home to the historic village of Tadmor. Vandalia also is home to the Bruce Sucher Recreation Center, a highly popular recreational facility.

Education
Vandalia-Butler City School District is one of only two districts to win the excellency rating every year since 2005. The schools have shown constant improvement. The school district has built a new middle school designed by SHP Leading Design based in Cincinnati, and the district has also renovated and enlarged Butler High School.  The school won the All-Sports Trophy several times in the 1990s and 2000s.

St. Christopher Catholic School is one of the top-performing private schools in the area.

Creative Images Institute of Cosmetology is based in Vandalia.

The Western Ohio Japanese Language School (オハイオ西部日本語学校 Ohio Seibu Nihongo Gakkō), a part-time Japanese supplementary school, previously held its classes at the Northridge / Vandalia-Butler Preschool in Vandalia.

Vandalia has a public library, a branch of the Dayton Metro Library.

Media
Vandalia has its weekly community paper, the Vandalia Drummer. Many in the community also receive city-published tabloids like Business at the Crossroads. Many residents throughout this area also regularly read the Dayton Daily News, the metropolitan area's main daily newspaper.

Infrastructure

Regional cooperation
In 2009 Vandalia and Butler Township officials announced plans to jointly staff two fire stations to improve service delivery and response times. The joint agreement marks the third time in the recent past that Vandalia City officials have joined with neighboring communities for a common goal. The City of Vandalia shares a wastewater treatment facility with Tipp City and Huber Heights. The Tri-Cities Wastewater Treatment Plant has been in operation since 1985, and jointly owned by the three cities since 1991. In 2007, the Northern Area Water Authority (NAWA) began supplying drinking water to Vandalia and Tipp City. The plant is jointly owned by the two communities.

Airport conflicts

The city of Dayton had proposed an extension to the Dayton International Airport in 1998 that would annex part of Butler Township. The plan would disturb the natural shape of the city of Vandalia and it would disturb the shape of the National Road or Rt. 40. The proposals were canceled, however in 2008, when the city of Vandalia purchased the same land that was partially owned by the University of Dayton, the city of Dayton began to work on their redeveloped expansion of the airport which included a new sight tower and updating of landscaping and the Airport Access Road. The same land will soon see increased development with the opening of MAC, Morton Middle School, Vandalia-Butler Fire Station #1, and is zoned for increased high end, tech office jobs.  The land is also heavily developed as an office park with a mix of retail stores and restaurants.

Notable people
Josh Betts, former CFL quarterback
Roger Clemens, seven-time Cy Young Award winner, was born in Dayton and lived in Vandalia until he was 15
Taylor Decker, football player for the Detroit Lions
Matt Lepay, sports broadcaster for the Wisconsin Badgers and Milwaukee Brewers
Cory Vance, former Major League Baseball player for the Colorado Rockies

Sister cities

References

External links

City website

Cities in Montgomery County, Ohio
National Road
Populated places established in 1838
1838 establishments in Ohio
Cities in Ohio